The New Zealand Youth Choir is a mixed choir consisting of around 50 singers, auditioned nationally every 3 years from around New Zealand. The choir accepts members aged between 18 and 25 at the time of audition, and places will generally be offered for three years.

The choir was formed in 1979 by Guy Jansen and has subsequently been conducted by Professor Peter Godfrey (1980 to 1988), Dr Karen Grylls (1989 to 2010) and David Squire (since 2011). As at February 2015, Dr Grylls is an associate professor and head of choral studies at the University of Auckland. The choir is governed by the Choirs Aotearoa New Zealand Trust (which also governs Voices New Zealand Chamber Choir and the NZYC Alumni Choir).  The Chief Executive of the Trust is Arne Herrmann, who has held this position since mid 2016.

International tours and awards 

The choir has achieved considerable success both within New Zealand and internationally, including winning the Let the Peoples Sing competition in 1992, the 'Choir of the World' title at the Llangollen International Musical Eisteddfod in 1999, and the 'Grand Prix Slovakia' in the same year.

In 2010 the choir toured to Singapore, Seoul, Shanghai (where it performed as part of Expo 2010), Brisbane, Canberra, and Sydney. The final concert for the tour was broadcast live on ABC Classic FM and Radio New Zealand Concert.

At the end of 2013 the choir toured to Los Angeles (where it participated in a performance of Benjamin Britten's War Requiem at the Walt Disney Concert Hall), Toronto, Ottawa, Montreal, Boston, New York and Washington DC.

During its 2016 European Landmark Tour, NZYC won the GRAND PRIX at the 2016 IFAS in Pardubice Czech Republic and also all four categories it competed in. It also performed at Windsor Castle, Cambridge Summer Music Festival, Ely Cathedral, in Oxford, Notre Dame de Paris, and Le Quesnoy.

Alumni 

Notable former members of the choir include: conductor Tecwyn Evans, soprano Anna Leese, bass baritone Jonathan Lemalu, tenor Simon O'Neill, soprano Madeleine Pierard, baritone Teddy Tahu Rhodes, bass Martin Snell, all three members of Sol3 Mio, baritone in the King's Singers Chris Bruerton, journalist Hilary Barry, and composers Igelese Ete, David Hamilton, Anthony Ritchie and Glenda Keam.

Discography

References

External links 
 New Zealand Youth Choir – the official website

National choirs
New Zealand choirs
Youth choirs
Musical groups established in 1979